Kerala Irrigation Infrastructure Development Corporation Limited (KIIDC) is a wholly owned company of the Government of Kerala formed for the promotion and development of medium and large scale irrigation and water supply projects units in the State. It is the nodal agency for foreign and domestic investments in the irrigation sector in Kerala,

KIIDC incorporated on 3 August 2000. This company is registered at Registrar of Companies, Ernakulam.

Services 
KIIDC provides comprehensive support for investors facilitating constant interaction between the government and the irrigation sector.

Projects

Hilly Aqua packed drinking water 
KIIDC sought to arrest the spiralling price of packaged drinking water in the state. The Government sanctioned the establishment of a drinking water bottle plant. Construction started in Mrala, Thodupuzha in 2014 and trial production began in 2015. Hilly Aqua has four outlets in Ernakulam district- Kakkanad, Kolencherry, Palichirangara and Nedumbassery.

See also 
 Public sector undertakings in Kerala

References

External links 

Irrigation in Kerala
Government agencies established in 2000
2000 establishments in Kerala
Indian companies established in 2000
Government-owned companies of Kerala